George Goldsmith (11 March 1905 – 1974) was an English professional footballer who played for Bishop Auckland, Loftus Albion, Hull City, Tottenham Hotspur and Bolton Wanderers.

Football career 
Goldsmith played non-League football for Bishop Auckland and Loftus Albion before joining Hull City. The right back played 172 matches for the Anlaby Road club between 1928 and 1933. In 1934, Goldsmith signed for Tottenham Hotspur and participated in one match  before joining Bolton Wanderers where he went on to feature in a further 19 matches.

References 

1905 births
1974 deaths
People from Loftus, North Yorkshire
English footballers
Bishop Auckland F.C. players
Loftus Albion F.C. players
Hull City A.F.C. players
Tottenham Hotspur F.C. players
Bolton Wanderers F.C. players
English Football League players
Sportspeople from Yorkshire
Association football defenders